Smithson Glacier is a tributary glacier in the Bowers Mountains. It drains the slopes near Mount Verhage and flows north along the west side of Posey Range to enter Graveson Glacier adjacent to Mount Draeger. Mapped by United States Geological Survey (USGS) from ground surveys and U.S. Navy air photos, 1960–62. Named by Advisory Committee on Antarctic Names (US-ACAN) for Scott B. Smithson, geologist at McMurdo Station, 1967–68.

Glaciers of Pennell Coast